Eduardo Wandenkolk was a Brazilian Rear-Admiral and politician of Dutch descent who participated in the Revolta da Armada against the new First Brazilian Republic as well as the Minister of the Navy of the government of Deodoro da Fonseca and Floriano Peixoto.

Biography

Early Military Career
Eduardo was born on June 29, 1838, as the son of José Eduardo Wandenkolk and Don Martina Gomensoro Wandenkolk. On March 1, 1853, he joined the Imperial Brazilian Navy as a midshipsman when he was only 14. He was promoted to 2nd Lieutenant on June 11, 1858, and later to 1st Lieutenant on June 11, 1858. After his promotion to captain on April 12, 1868, he participated in the Paraguayan War. For his service in the war, Eduardo Wandenkolk was decorated with the silver medals of the Eastern Campaign for his participation at the Siege of Uruguaiana and the Passage of Humaitá. On November 17, 1875, he was promoted to frigate captain and took command of the Port Authority in the province of Rio Grande do Sul.

He later joined the Club Militar which conspired against the Brazilian monarchy as well as a member of the Grande Oriente do Brasil. After the coup d'état of November 15, 1889, which overthrew the monarchy, he was Minister of the Navy from November 15, 1889, to January 22, 1891, and from March 12 to April 19, 1890. In 1890, Wandenkolk was elected to the Federal Senate. He was then made president of the Club Militar, succeeding Admiral Custódio de Melo.

Revolta da Armada

However the revolt was crushed due to lack of ammunition and food and Wandenkolk was arrested for conspiring against the government and sent to Tabatinga along with other political prisoners of the revolt. His rights were then restored and was made Chief of Staff of the Armada on January 3, 1900.

He was buried in a mausoleum at the Cemitério de São João Batista, in Botafogo, Rio de Janeiro.

References

External links
Relatório apresentado ao Chefe do Governo Provisório  pelo vice-almirante Eduardo Wandenkolk, Ministro e Secretário de Estado dos Negócios da Marinha, em 15 de novembro de 1890 
Biografia no Clube Militar 

1838 births
1902 deaths
People from Rio de Janeiro (city)
Brazilian military personnel of the Paraguayan War
19th-century Brazilian politicians
Brazilian admirals
Politicians from Rio de Janeiro (city)
Brazilian people of Dutch descent
Candidates for Vice President of Brazil